A wind chill warning is a hazardous weather statement issued by local forecast offices of the National Weather Service (NWS) in the United States and previously by the Meteorological Service of Environment and Climate Change Canada (ECCC) when wind chills are forecast to reach values low enough for residents and travelers to be susceptible to life-threatening medical conditions (such as severe frostbite and hypothermia) or death associated with accelerated body heat loss.

Extreme wind chills meeting Wind Chill Warning criteria can generate a significant decrease in body temperature, and induce frostbite damage to exposed skin and other tissue over an accelerated period of time (onsetting within as little as 10 to 15 minutes in severe cases). People within the warned area are advised to avoid venturing outdoors unless conducting necessary travel; if going outside, extra precaution should be taken against the likelihood of developing hypothermia and frostbite by wearing multiple layers of clothing (such as a thick winter coat, a scarf and long underwear, in addition to layers of outerwear) as well as a hat (e.g., a knit cap that can be used to cover the ears) and gloves.

In the United States, the exact definition varies from state to state or between National Weather Service county warning areas, and a warning is used to express more severe conditions than a wind chill advisory. If extreme wind chills are expected to quickly lead to frostbite or death, then enhanced wording with the words particularly dangerous situation may be added to the text; this is rarely issued. The National Weather Service in Twin Cities/Chanhassen was the first office to do this on Sunday, January 5, 2014.

As of April 8 2014, Environment Canada replaced the Wind Chill Warning with an Extreme Cold Warning. The warning is still issued based on a region's normal climate. In the older system a wind chill warning for Southern Ontario and Atlantic Canada was issued when the wind chill dropped to -35. Under the new system the extreme cold warning is issued based on either the temperature or the wind chill being a certain value for at least two hours.

Sample Wind Chill Warning
The following is an example of a Wind Chill Warning issued by the National Weather Service office in Detroit, Michigan.

063 
WWUS43 KDTX 042112
WSWDTX

URGENT - WINTER WEATHER MESSAGE
NATIONAL WEATHER SERVICE DETROIT/PONTIAC MI
412 PM EST SUN FEB 4 2007

...DANGEROUS ARCTIC AIRMASS TO CAUSE BITTERLY COLD WIND CHILLS...

.AN ARCTIC AIRMASS WILL REMAIN OVER SOUTHEAST LOWER MICHIGAN INTO
THE EARLY PART OF THE WEEK. TEMPERATURES OVERNIGHT WILL DROP TO
BETWEEN -5 AND -15 DEGREES. WINDS GUSTING TO NEARLY 25 MPH THIS
AFTERNOON WILL DECREASE OVERNIGHT...BUT WILL CONTINUE TO BLOW AT
SPEEDS OF 10 TO 15 MPH. SOME LOCALLY HIGHER GUSTS WILL ALSO BE
POSSIBLE NEAR THE LAKE HURON SHORELINE. THE COMBINATION OF VERY
COLD TEMPERATURES AND WINDS WILL PRODUCE WIND CHILL READINGS
BETWEEN 20 AND 35 BELOW ZERO OVERNIGHT INTO EARLY MONDAY MORNING. 

MIZ047>049-053>055-050515-
/O.UPG.KDTX.WC.Y.0001.000000T0000Z-070205T1700Z/
/O.NEW.KDTX.WC.W.0001.070204T2112Z-070205T1700Z/
MIDLAND-BAY-HURON-SAGINAW-TUSCOLA-SANILAC-
INCLUDING THE CITIES OF...MIDLAND...BAY CITY...BAD AXE...
SAGINAW...CARO...SANDUSKY
412 PM EST SUN FEB 4 2007

...WIND CHILL WARNING IN EFFECT UNTIL 12 PM EST MONDAY...

THE NATIONAL WEATHER SERVICE IN DETROIT/PONTIAC HAS ISSUED A WIND
CHILL WARNING...WHICH IS IN EFFECT UNTIL 12 PM EST MONDAY. THE
WIND CHILL ADVISORY IS NO LONGER IN EFFECT. 

TEMPERATURES ACROSS THE SAGINAW VALLEY AND NORTHERN THUMB WILL
FALL TO AROUND 10 BELOW ZERO OVERNIGHT. THESE BITTERLY COLD
TEMPERATURES WILL COMBINE WITH WINDS OF 10 TO 15 MPH TO CAUSE
VERY LOW WIND CHILL READINGS NEAR 30 BELOW ZERO. SOME LOCALLY
HIGHER WIND GUSTS UP TO 25 MPH WILL BE POSSIBLE NEAR THE LAKE
HURON SHORELINE. WIND CHILLS VALUES WILL REMAIN NEAR 30 BELOW ZERO
INTO MONDAY MORNING BEFORE TEMPERATURES START TO CLIMB. 

A WIND CHILL WARNING MEANS THE COMBINATION OF VERY COLD AIR AND
STRONG WINDS WILL CREATE DANGEROUSLY LOW WIND CHILL VALUES. THIS
WILL RESULT IN FROST BITE AND LEAD TO HYPOTHERMIA IF PRECAUTIONS
ARE NOT TAKEN. PERSONS SHOULD AVOID GOING OUTDOORS AND WEAR WARM
PROTECTIVE CLOTHING IF THEY MUST VENTURE OUTSIDE.

$$

Sample PDS Wind Chill Warning
The following is an example of a particularly dangerous situation Wind Chill Warning issued by the National Weather Service office in Chanhassen, Minnesota.

WWUS43 KMPX 050957
WSWMPX

URGENT - WINTER WEATHER MESSAGE
NATIONAL WEATHER SERVICE TWIN CITIES/CHANHASSEN MN
357 AM CST SUN JAN 5 2014

...HISTORIC AND LIFE-THREATENING COLD AIR HAS ARRIVED...
...THIS IS A PARTICULARLY DANGEROUS SITUATION...

.THE COLDEST AIRMASS SINCE 1996 CONTINUES TO MOVE SOUTHEAST OUT
OF CANADA AND INTO MINNESOTA AND WISCONSIN. WIND CHILL VALUES WILL
RANGE BETWEEN 30 AND 45 BELOW TODAY AND CONTINUE TO FALL THROUGH
MONDAY MORNING. AIR TEMPERATURES TONIGHT WILL DROP INTO THE 20S
AND 30S BELOW ZERO. GUSTY WEST OR NORTHWEST WINDS COMBINED WITH
THESE EXTREMELY COLD TEMPERATURES WILL PRODUCE WIND CHILLS OF 50 
TO 65 BELOW ZERO LATE TONIGHT AND EARLY MONDAY.

WIND CHILLS COLDER THAN 50 BELOW CAN CAUSE EXPOSED FLESH TO
FREEZE IN ONLY 5 MINUTES. A WIND CHILL WARNING IS IN EFFECT FOR
CENTRAL AND SOUTHERN MINNESOTA AND WEST CENTRAL WISCONSIN THROUGH
NOON TUESDAY.

THE GUSTY WINDS WILL ALSO BRING AREAS OF BLOWING SNOW TO MUCH OF
THE AREA TODAY AND TONIGHT. WHERE GUSTS REACH 35 TO 45 MPH OVER
WESTERN AND SOUTHERN MINNESOTA...VISIBILITIES MAY OCCASIONALLY BE
REDUCED TO LESS THAN A HALF MILE IN NEAR BLIZZARD CONDITIONS. THIS
WILL BRING AN ADDITIONAL LEVEL OF DANGER TO ANYONE STRANDED.

MNZ041-047-048-054>057-064-065-067-073>075-082>085-091>093-052115-
/O.CON.KMPX.WC.W.0001.000000T0000Z-140107T1800Z/
DOUGLAS-STEVENS-POPE-LAC QUI PARLE-SWIFT-CHIPPEWA-KANDIYOHI-
YELLOW MEDICINE-RENVILLE-SIBLEY-REDWOOD-BROWN-NICOLLET-WATONWAN-
BLUE EARTH-WASECA-STEELE-MARTIN-FARIBAULT-FREEBORN-
INCLUDING THE CITIES OF...ALEXANDRIA...MORRIS...GLENWOOD...
MADISON...BENSON...MONTEVIDEO...WILLMAR...GRANITE FALLS...
OLIVIA...GAYLORD...REDWOOD FALLS...NEW ULM...ST. PETER...
ST. JAMES...MANKATO...WASECA...OWATONNA...FAIRMONT...BLUE EARTH...
ALBERT LEA
357 AM CST SUN JAN 5 2014

...WIND CHILL WARNING REMAINS IN EFFECT UNTIL NOON CST TUESDAY...

A WIND CHILL WARNING REMAINS IN EFFECT UNTIL NOON CST TUESDAY. 

* THIS IS A PARTICULARLY DANGEROUS SITUATION!

* WIND CHILL VALUES: 35 TO 65 BELOW...WITH THE COLDEST READINGS
  TONIGHT AND MONDAY MORNING.

* IMPACTS: EXPOSED FLESH WILL FREEZE IN 10 MINUTES WITH WIND
  CHILLS OF 35 BELOW...AND IN 5 MINUTES WITH WIND CHILLS OF 50
  BELOW OR COLDER.

* OTHER IMPACTS...WINDS GUSTING BETWEEN 35 AND 45 MPH THIS
  AFTERNOON AND TONIGHT WILL LEAD TO BLOWING SNOW WITH
  VISIBILITIES OCCASIONALLY DROPPING TO 1/2 MILE OR LESS IN NEAR
  BLIZZARD CONDITIONS. SHOULD YOUR VEHICLE BECOME STRANDED...YOUR
  LIFE WILL BE AT RISK. CONSIDER POSTPONING ALL TRAVEL.

PRECAUTIONARY/PREPAREDNESS ACTIONS...

A WIND CHILL WARNING MEANS THE COMBINATION OF VERY COLD AIR AND
STRONG WINDS WILL CREATE DANGEROUSLY LOW WIND CHILL VALUES. THIS
WILL RESULT IN FROST BITE AND LEAD TO HYPOTHERMIA OR DEATH IF
PRECAUTIONS ARE NOT TAKEN.

&&

$$

MNZ042>045-049>053-058>063-066-068>070-076>078-WIZ014>016-023>028-
052115-
/O.CON.KMPX.WC.W.0001.000000T0000Z-140107T1800Z/
TODD-MORRISON-MILLE LACS-KANABEC-STEARNS-BENTON-SHERBURNE-ISANTI-
CHISAGO-MEEKER-WRIGHT-HENNEPIN-ANOKA-RAMSEY-WASHINGTON-MCLEOD-
CARVER-SCOTT-DAKOTA-LE SUEUR-RICE-GOODHUE-POLK-BARRON-RUSK-
ST. CROIX-PIERCE-DUNN-PEPIN-CHIPPEWA-EAU CLAIRE-
INCLUDING THE CITIES OF...LONG PRAIRIE...LITTLE FALLS...
PRINCETON...MORA...ST. CLOUD...FOLEY...ELK RIVER...CAMBRIDGE...
CENTER CITY...LITCHFIELD...MONTICELLO...MINNEAPOLIS...BLAINE...
ST. PAUL...STILLWATER...HUTCHINSON...CHASKA...SHAKOPEE...
BURNSVILLE...LE SUEUR...FARIBAULT...RED WING...AMERY...
BALSAM LAKE...RICE LAKE...BARRON...LADYSMITH...HUDSON...
NEW RICHMOND...RIVER FALLS...PRESCOTT...MENOMONIE...BOYCEVILLE...
DURAND...PEPIN...CHIPPEWA FALLS...BLOOMER...EAU CLAIRE...ALTOONA
357 AM CST SUN JAN 5 2014

...WIND CHILL WARNING REMAINS IN EFFECT UNTIL NOON CST TUESDAY...

A WIND CHILL WARNING REMAINS IN EFFECT UNTIL NOON CST TUESDAY. 

* THIS IS A PARTICULARLY DANGEROUS SITUATION!

* WIND CHILL VALUES: 35 TO 65 BELOW...WITH THE COLDEST READINGS
  TONIGHT AND MONDAY MORNING.

* IMPACTS: EXPOSED FLESH WILL FREEZE IN 10 MINUTES WITH WIND
  CHILLS OF 35 BELOW...AND IN 5 MINUTES WITH WIND CHILLS OF 50
  BELOW OR COLDER.

* OTHER IMPACTS...AREAS OF BLOWING SNOW ARE POSSIBLE AS WINDS GUST
  AS HIGH AS 35 MPH THIS AFTERNOON AND TONIGHT.

PRECAUTIONARY/PREPAREDNESS ACTIONS...

A WIND CHILL WARNING MEANS THE COMBINATION OF VERY COLD AIR AND
STRONG WINDS WILL CREATE DANGEROUSLY LOW WIND CHILL VALUES. THIS
WILL RESULT IN FROST BITE AND LEAD TO HYPOTHERMIA OR DEATH IF
PRECAUTIONS ARE NOT TAKEN.

&&

$$

BORGHOFF

See also
 Severe weather terminology (United States)

References

External links
 National Weather Service

Weather warnings and advisories
Severe weather and convection
Meteorological Service of Canada